The ALCO RSD-39 was a six axle, low axle weight diesel-electric locomotive built by ALCO and under license by Euskalduna.

Fifty units were built for Alco  between 1965—1967 for RENFE, forming part of Renfe class 313. Other versions were exported to railways in South America.

Original buyers

References 

C-C locomotives
RSD-39
Railway locomotives introduced in 1965
Diesel-electric locomotives of Spain
Diesel-electric locomotives of Ecuador
Diesel-electric locomotives of Peru